The 2020 İstanbul Cup (also known as the TEB BNP Paribas Tennis Championship İstanbul for sponsorship reasons) was a tennis tournament played on outdoor clay courts. It was the 13th edition of the İstanbul Cup, and part of the WTA International tournaments of the 2020 WTA Tour. It took place in Istanbul, Turkey, from 8 through 13 September 2020.

Points and prize money

Prize money

Singles main-draw entrants

Seeds

 Rankings are as of August 31, 2020.

Other entrants
The following players received wildcards into the singles main draw:
  Çağla Büyükakçay 
  Berfu Cengiz 
  Pemra Özgen

The following players received entry using a protected ranking into the singles main draw:
  Kateryna Bondarenko
  Anna Karolína Schmiedlová

The following players received entry from the qualifying draw:
  Eugenie Bouchard 
  Olga Danilović
  Tereza Martincová 
  Ellen Perez

Withdrawals
Before the tournament
  Marie Bouzková → replaced by  Kateryna Bondarenko
  Sorana Cîrstea → replaced by  Greet Minnen
  Hsieh Su-wei → replaced by  Patricia Maria Țig
  Veronika Kudermetova → replaced by  Margarita Gasparyan
  Magda Linette → replaced by  Aliaksandra Sasnovich
  Elise Mertens → replaced by  Katarina Zavatska
  Kristina Mladenovic → replaced by  Jasmine Paolini
  Jeļena Ostapenko → replaced by  Viktória Kužmová
  Yulia Putintseva → replaced by  Stefanie Vögele
  Anastasija Sevastova → replaced by  Kaja Juvan
  Laura Siegemund → replaced by  Viktoriya Tomova
  Ajla Tomljanović → replaced by  Danka Kovinić
  Tamara Zidanšek → replaced by  Anna Karolína Schmiedlová

Doubles main-draw entrants

Seeds 

 1 Rankings as of August 31, 2020.

Other entrants 
The following pairs received wildcards into the doubles main draw:
  Ayla Aksu /  İpek Öz
  Eugenie Bouchard /  Başak Eraydın
The following pair received entry as alternates:
  Anna Karolína Schmiedlová /  Katarina Zavatska

Withdrawals
Before the tournament
  Heather Watson

Champions

Singles

  Patricia Maria Țig def.  Eugenie Bouchard 2–6, 6–1, 7–6(7–4)

Doubles

  Alexa Guarachi /  Desirae Krawczyk def.  Ellen Perez /  Storm Sanders, 6–1, 6–3

References

External links
 Official page 

2020 in Istanbul
Ist
Istanbul Cup
İstanbul Cup
İstanbul Cup
Istanbul